Ronald Edward Rangi (4 February 1941 – 13 September 1988) was a New Zealand rugby union player. A centre three-quarter, Rangi represented  at a provincial level, and was a member of the New Zealand national side, the All Blacks, from 1964 to 1966. He made 10 appearances for the All Blacks, all of them in test matches, scoring three tries. Of Māori descent, Rangi played for the New Zealand Māori side between 1963 and 1965, and was awarded the Tom French Cup for the Māori player of the year in 1964 and 1965.

References

1941 births
1988 deaths
Rugby union players from Auckland
New Zealand rugby union players
New Zealand international rugby union players
Auckland rugby union players
Rugby union centres
Māori All Blacks players